Pizzo di Cassimoi is a mountain of the Lepontine Alps, located on the border between the Swiss cantons of Ticino (west) and Graubünden (east). The mountain overlooks two lakes: Lago di Luzzone on its north-eastern side and Zervreilasee on its north-eastern side.

A glacier named Vadrecc di Sorda lies over the northern flanks below a secondary summit (Pizzo Cassinello, 3,103 metres) on the side of Ticino.

References

External links
Pizzo di Cassimoi on Summitpost
Pizzo di Cassimoi on Hikr
Position on map

Mountains of the Alps
Alpine three-thousanders
Mountains of Switzerland
Mountains of Ticino
Mountains of Graubünden
Graubünden–Ticino border
Lepontine Alps
Vals, Switzerland